Miomir Kecmanović (born 31 August 1999) is a Serbian professional tennis player. Kecmanović reached his best singles ranking of world No. 27 on 16 January 2023 and he peaked at world No. 161 on 16 September 2019 in the doubles rankings. He has won one singles and one doubles ATP title, as well as two Challenger titles in his career. He is currently the No. 2 Serbian player.

Career

Juniors: Orange Bowl champion & junior No. 1
In December 2015, Kecmanović won the Orange Bowl in a 3-set match against Stefanos Tsitsipas from Greece, 6–3, 2–6, 7–6(5). He reached the final in singles at 2016 Junior US Open where he was defeated by Canadian Félix Auger-Aliassime. He finished the year 2016 as ITF Juniors number 1 ranked tennis player.

2016: Davis Cup alternate player
Kecmanović was a fifth (reserve) player on a Serbian Davis Cup team in their quarterfinal tie against Great Britain in the 2016 Davis Cup – a standard practice of Tennis Federation of Serbia for each tie to invite a different talented young player to practice with regular players and gain necessary experience. Kecmanović credited this experience for finishing the year as junior world No. 1 and said that he is looking forward to one day make the team and play for Serbia.

2017: Turning pro & first Challenger title
In January 2017, Kecmanović won his first singles ITF pro circuit title in Sunrise, Florida, US. In March, he received a wild card entry for the qualifying draw at Miami Masters and defeated 22nd seed and world No. 117 Henri Laaksonen in straight sets in the first round, before losing the deciding qualifying match to 11th seed and world No. 114 Lukáš Lacko. Serbian Davis Cup captain, Nenad Zimonjić, planned to include Kecmanović as a fifth player for Serbia's 7–9 April Davis Cup quarterfinal tie versus Spain, but as Kecmanović received a wild card for Panamá Cup Challenger, he instead chose to play in his first career challenger and lost in the first round to top seed and world No. 86 Horacio Zeballos in 3 sets, 6–2, 4–6, 2–6. He next played in San Luis Potosí Challenger in Mexico and had his first wins on the Challenger level after defeating 3rd seed and world No. 135 Stefan Kozlov in straight sets, Emilio Gómez in three sets and 7th seed Marcelo Arévalo in straight sets, before losing in the semifinals to 8th seed Adrián Menéndez-Maceiras. At Sarasota Kecmanović played in his third successive challenger, losing in the second round to 7th seed and world No. 114 Laaksonen. Kecmanović received a wild card for the qualifying draw of another ATP tournament, Istanbul Open, where he defeated 2nd seed Mirza Bašić in the opening round, but lost to 8th seed Daniel Brands in the deciding qualifier.

Between May and July, Kecmanović played in four futures tournaments in Turkey and Belgium, respectively, winning two and reaching another final and one semifinal. He then resumed playing in challengers, playing three in Asia, with the best result coming in August in Chengdu, where he was stopped in the quarterfinals. In September, Kecmanović was again in the plans to be a fifth player in 15–17 September Davis Cup semifinal against France, but as he received a wildcard for Banja Luka Challenger, he chose to play it in order to improve his ATP ranking, and again lost in the first round. He next played three futures in Italy, getting to one semifinal and two quarterfinals. He finished the season playing in three challengers in China and had his biggest achievement to date in October in Suzhou, when he won the first challenger title of his career by beating 3rd seed and world No. 113 Radu Albot, 6–4, 6–4, in the final.

2018: Top 150, WTT champion & Finals MVP
After reaching two quarterfinals in three challengers to start the season, Kecmanović broke into the top 200 for the first time in his career on February 5, when he was ranked 194th on the ATP list. In March, he made his ATP main draw debut when he was granted wild card for Miami Masters, losing to Denis Istomin in the first round. In April, he defeated 4th seed Michael Mmoh and 6th seed Dennis Novikov in the qualifying rounds to reach the main draw of U.S. Men's Clay Court Championships ATP 250 event in Houston, where he lost to 7th seed Ryan Harrison in the first round.

In July and August, Kecmanović played World TeamTennis league and helped Springfield Lasers win its first ever championship after losing five times in the finals between 1999 and 2014. They defeated Philadelphia Freedoms, 19–18 in the final, after Kecmanović rallied from a 1–3 deficit in the final set to defeat Kevin King, 5–3, and earn Finals MVP honors.

On the strength of three semifinal and one quarterfinal appearance in challenger events in September and October, Kecmanović reached the top 150 for the first time on October 22, being ranked world No. 149. He closed out the season on a high note, reaching the final of the Liuzhou challenger and winning the Shenzhen challenger, to finish the season with a then career-high ranking of world No. 132.

2019: Top 50, second WTT championship, first ATP final

He earned his first ATP victory by defeating world No. 56 Leonardo Mayer at the Brisbane International. He played in the BNP Paribas Open as a lucky loser. He defeated 30th seed Laslo Đere on his way to the quarterfinals, before losing to in straight sets to Milos Raonic. This result meant that Kecmanović was ranked in the top 100 for the first time. In Miami, he beat former top-10 player Ernests Gulbis in the first round before losing to Frances Tiafoe in two tiebreak sets.

At the French Open, Kecmanović played in the main draw, beating Denis Kudla in five sets before losing to David Goffin. This was his first grand slam win. At the Antalya Open, he reached his first ATP final, losing to Lorenzo Sonego in the final. His semi final against 3rd seed Jordan Thompson was notable for featuring no breaks of serve, with Kecmanović saving all three break points on his serve.

Kecmanović won his first Wimbledon match at The Championships 2019, beating Roberto Carballés Baena in four sets, before retiring against Benoît Paire two sets to love down. In Atlanta, he beat Jack Sock and 8th seed Ugo Humbert both in straight sets, before losing in the quarter-finals to eventual finalist and 2nd seed Taylor Fritz. In the Citi Open, he beat Alexei Popyrin and Pierre-Hugues Herbert before losing to Norbert Gombos. Having missed the Roger's Cup Masters Tournament, Kecmanović's breakthrough came at the Western and Southern Open. In the qualifying rounds, he beat Antoine Hoang and Feliciano López in straight sets. In the first round, he beat fellow 19 year old Félix Auger-Aliassime in straight sets. He then gained his first win over a top ten player by beating 7th seed Alexander Zverev in three sets. This victory ensured that Kecmanović would break into the top 50 for the first time. He then lost in straight sets to Roberto Bautista Agut.

2020: First ATP title
Kecmanović started off the new decade by participating in the ATP 250 Qatar Open. He defeated Australian Jordan Thompson before defeating third seed Jo-Wilfried Tsonga in the round of sixteen. He won his first ATP title at the Austrian Open Kitzbühel in September.

2021: Top 40 debut 
After reaching the second round at the Australian Open, losing to Adrian Mannarino, and following a semifinal run at the 2021 Argentina Open, Kecmanović achieved his best singles ranking of world No. 38 on 8 March 2021. During the Latin American Swing, he hired former World No. 3 player David Nalbandian as his coach for a trial period.

2022: Australian Open fourth round, top 30

Kecmanović was initially set to play Novak Djokovic in the Australian Open.  Due to Djokovic’s visa issues and his COVID-19 vaccination status, that ultimately led to his deportation, Kecmanović instead faced Salvatore Caruso who was promoted to Djokovic's original position as a lucky loser. Kecmanovic defeated Caruso in straight sets, and advanced to the second round.
Next he defeated Tommy Paul in straight sets and Lorenzo Sonego to make his first fourth round at a Major, which is his best result at a Grand Slam. He lost to 17th seed Gaël Monfils in straight sets in the fourth round. At the 2022 Rio Open he reached the quarterfinals as a qualifier defeating sixth seed Lorenzo Sonego. He lost to Francisco Cerundolo in a second consecutive match, the first loss coming at the previous tournament, the 2022 Argentina Open.

At the BNP Paribas Open, Kecmanović reached his 2nd career Masters 1000 quarterfinal. He defeated Liam Broady, 24th seed Marin Čilić, Botic van de Zandschulp, and 6th seed Matteo Berrettini, earning the second Top 10 win of his career. He lost in the quarterfinals in three sets to eventual champion Taylor Fritz.

The following week at the Miami Open, Kecmanović reached his 2nd consecutive Masters 1000 quarterfinal and 3rd overall. He defeated Jack Sock, 7th seed and 9th ranked Félix Auger-Aliassime for his third Top 10 win, Sebastian Korda, and 11th seed Taylor Fritz in a rematch of the previous week's Indian Wells quarterfinal. He lost to eventual champion Carlos Alcaraz in the quarterfinal in a final set tie-breaker. Due to this result, Kecmanović tied his career high ranking of World No. 38. He made his debut in the top 30 on 13 June 2022 following a third round showing for the first time in his career at the 2022 French Open.

At Wimbledon, he beat Alejandro Tabilo and John Millman in the first two rounds before losing to the number 1 seed and eventual champion Novak Djokovic in the third round.

2023: Delray Beach final, 100th ATP career win
In January, in Adelaide, Miomir won in the first round by beating Christopher O'Connell in straight sets. In the round of 16, he lost to third seed Daniil Medvedev. The following week, at the Adelaide International 2, he beat Kyle Edmund in the first round, Jason Kubler in the second round, before being beaten in three sets by the defending champion, Thanasi Kokkinakis. With this result, Kecmanovic reached his career best singles ranking at No. 27 on 16 January 2023. At the Australian Open, seeded No. 26, he surprisingly lost in the first round against Chilean Nicolás Jarry.

In February, Kecmanovic, as the fourth seed, reached his first final of the year at Delray Beach Open with wins over Nuno Borges and Marcos Giron, both in straight sets, and in the semifinals he scored his 100th ATP tour victory by defeating Radu Albot. In the final, Kecmanovic lost in three sets to the top seed Taylor Fritz.

Personal
Born in Belgrade, to Dragutin Kecmanović and Maja Pavlov, both doctors, specialists in general and abdominal surgery. Miomir began playing tennis at the age of 6 with his maternal grandfather, Jovan Pavlov, who was a General in Yugoslav People's Army. His paternal grandfather was Prof. Miomir Kecmanovic, after whom Miomir was named, who played a crucial role in suppressing the 1972 Yugoslav smallpox outbreak. Growing up, his tennis idols were Roger Federer and Novak Djokovic. At age 13, he moved to Florida with his aunt, Tanja Pavlov, a psychologist, to train at IMG Academy.  His aunt also acts as his manager.

Performance timelines

Singles
Current through the 2023 Mexican Open.

Doubles

ATP career finals

Singles: 3 (1 title, 2 runner-ups)

Doubles: 1 (1 title)

Team Tennis Leagues

League finals: 2 (2 championships)

*(HC): Head Coach, (F): Franchise Player, (W): Wildcard Player, (R): Roster Player, (S): Substitute Player

ATP Challenger Tour and ITF Futures finals
Singles: 8 (5 titles, 3 runners-up)

Doubles: 2 (1 titles, 1 runners-up)

Junior Grand Slam finals
Singles: 1 (1 runner-up)

Record against other players
Record against top 10 playersKecmanović's record against those who have been ranked in the top 10, with active players in boldface:''

Top 10 Wins 
He has a  record against players who were, at the time the match was played, ranked in the top 10.

See also
Serbia Davis Cup team
List of Serbia Davis Cup team representatives
Sport in Serbia
Junior tennis

Notes

References

External links

 
 
 
 

1999 births
Living people
Tennis players from Belgrade
Serbian male tennis players
Serbian expatriate sportspeople in the United States
Tennis players at the 2020 Summer Olympics
Olympic tennis players of Serbia
21st-century Serbian people